is a Japanese professional shogi player ranked 5-dan.

Imaizumi (a former 3-dan professional shogi apprentice) was the first amateur to become a professional player via the Professional Admission Test (プロ編入試験 puro henyū shiken) in 2014.

Promotion history 
The promotion history for Imaizumi is as follows:
4-dan: April 1, 2015
5-Dan: June 18, 2020

Awards and honors
Imaizumi received the Japan Shogi Association's Masuda Award for the 20072008 shogi season for his idea of playing "R-32" on move one as gote in the opening. He was the first apprentice professional to win the award.

References

External links
ShogiHub: Professional Player Info · Imaizumi, Kenji
今泉の日常（旧今泉健司さんを応援する会公式ブログ）

1973 births
Japanese shogi players
Living people
Professional shogi players
Professional shogi players from Hiroshima Prefecture
Recipients of the Kōzō Masuda Award
People from Fukuyama, Hiroshima